Undisputed may refer to:

Film
 Undisputed (film), a 2002 action-thriller-drama film
 Undisputed (soundtrack), the soundtrack to the film
 Undisputed II: Last Man Standing, a 2006 American martial arts film
 Undisputed III: Redemption, a 2010 American martial arts film

Music
 Undisputed (Beenie Man album), 2006
 Undisputed (Deep Dish album), 1995
 Undisputed (DMX album), 2012
 Undisputed (Def Jam album), 2018
 "Undisputed" (song), a 2008 song by Ludacris

Television
 Dice: Undisputed, an American reality show on VH1
 Skip and Shannon: Undisputed, a sports talk show

See also